Robert McIntire Richey Jr. (born March 22, 1983) is an American college basketball coach and current head coach at Furman.

Coaching career
Richey's coaching career began at Charleston Southern in 2006, where he served on Barclay Radebaugh's staff until 2011. He joined the Furman staff under Jeff Jackson in 2011, and was retained as an assistant coach under Niko Medved. He served in the role until 2017, when he was elevated to interim head coach after Medved accepted the head coaching position at Drake. Richey coached the Paladins in their 2017 CollegeInsider.com Postseason Tournament semifinal matchup, in which they fell to St. Peters. Following the season, the interim tag was lifted and Richey became the 22nd head coach in Furman history.

As a coach, Richey emphasizes the retainment and development of his players, rather than the acquisition of talent. His coaching success has resulted in head coaching interviews with prominent NCAA programs, including with the University of South Carolina following the 2021 season.

2018–19 season
In his second season at the helm, Richey led the Paladins to wins over two teams that had reached the Final Four of the 2018 NCAA tournament (Loyola and defending national champion Villanova) and Furman's first-ever 6-0 record. After a 10-0 start, Furman became ranked in the AP Poll for the first time in school history and went on to be ranked for three consecutive weeks. Richey and Furman won their first 12 games and finished with what was then a school-record 25 wins. The Paladins ranked as high as 23rd in the AP poll and participated in the National Invitation Tournament, to which they had not been invited since 1991.

2022–2023 season 
After falling in the Southern Conference championship game the year before, Richey and the Paladins won the 2023 Southern Conference title and qualified for the NCAA tournament for the first time since 1980. They went on to shock 14th-ranked Virginia with a last-second steal and three-point shot in the Paladins' second-ever NCAA tournament win, securing a school-record 28 wins and national recognition for Furman.

Head coaching record

*Niko Medved accepted Drake position; Richey coached CIT semifinal game.

Personal life
Richey is a Christian. He is married to Jessica Richey, with whom he has three children.

References

1983 births
Living people
American men's basketball coaches
Basketball coaches from South Carolina
Charleston Southern Buccaneers men's basketball coaches
College men's basketball head coaches in the United States
Furman Paladins men's basketball coaches
North Greenville University alumni
People from Florence, South Carolina